In probability theory and statistics, the discrete Weibull distribution is the discrete variant of the Weibull distribution. It was first described by Nakagawa and Osaki in 1975.

Alternative parametrizations
Setting  makes the relationship with the geometric distribution apparent.

An alternative parametrization — related to the Pareto distribution — has been used to estimate parameters in infectious disease modelling. Therefore, the probability mass function can be expressed as

 ,

and the cumulative mass function can be expressed as

 .

Location-scale transformation
The continuous Weibull distribution has a close relationship with the Gumbel distribution which is easy to see when log-transforming the variable. A similar transformation can be made on the discrete Weibull.

By replacing  in the cumulative mass function:

 

We see that we get a location-scale parametrization:
 

which in estimation settings makes a lot of sense. This opens up the possibility of regression with frameworks developed for Weibull regression and extreme-value-theory.

See also
 Weibull distribution
 Geometric distribution
 q-Weibull distribution

References

Discrete distributions
Survival analysis
Extreme value data